Greatest Hits Tour may refer to:

 Greatest Hits Tour (Björk), a 2003 concert tour by Björk
 Greatest Hits Tour (Boston), a 1997 concert tour by Boston
 Greatest Hits Tour (Donna Summer), a 2005 concert tour by Donna Summer
 Greatest Hits Tour (Elton John), a 2011 concert tour by Elton John
 Greatest Hits Tour (Five), a 2013 concert tour by Five
 The Greatest Hits Tour (Girls Aloud), a 2007 concert tour by Girls Aloud
 Greatest Hits Tour (Olivia Newton-John), a 1999 concert tour by Olivia Newton-John
 The Greatest Hits Tour (Sugababes), a 2007 concert tour by the Sugababes
 The Greatest Hits Tour (Take That), a 2006 reunion tour by Take That
 Greatest Hits Tour (Westlife), a 2012 concert tour by Westlife
 Greatest Hits Live Tour, a 2005 live album by Level 42
 More Today Than Yesterday: The Greatest Hits Tour, a 2010 concert tour by Diana Ross
 Showgirl: The Greatest Hits Tour, a 2005 concert tour by Kylie Minogue

See also
 Greatest Hits (disambiguation)
 List of greatest hits albums
 Greatest Hits Live (disambiguation)#Tours